In music, 19 Tone Equal Temperament, called 19 TET, 19 EDO ("Equal Division of the Octave"), 19-ED2 ("Equal Division of 2:1) or 19 ET, is the tempered scale derived by dividing the octave into 19 equal steps (equal frequency ratios).

The fact that traditional western music maps unambiguously onto this scale (unless it presupposes 12-EDO enharmonic equivalences) makes it easier to perform such music in this tuning than in many other tunings.

19 EDO is the tuning of the syntonic temperament in which the tempered perfect fifth is equal to 694.737 cents, as shown in Figure 1 (look for the label "19 TET"). On an isomorphic keyboard, the fingering of music composed in 19 EDO is precisely the same as it is in any other syntonic tuning (such as 12 EDO), so long as the notes are "spelled properly" – that is, with no assumption that the sharp below matches the flat immediately above it (enharmonicity).

History and use
Division of the octave into 19 equal-width steps arose naturally out of Renaissance music theory. The ratio of four minor thirds to an octave (648:625 or 62.565 cents – the "greater diesis") was almost exactly a nineteenth of an octave. Interest in such a tuning system goes back to the 16th century, when composer Guillaume Costeley used it in his chanson Seigneur Dieu ta pitié of 1558. Costeley understood and desired the circulating aspect of this tuning.

In 1577, music theorist Francisco de Salinas in effect proposed it. Salinas discussed  comma meantone, in which the fifth is of size 694.786 cents. The fifth of 19 EDO is 694.737 cents, which is less than a twentieth of a cent narrower: imperceptible and less than tuning error. Salinas suggested tuning nineteen tones to the octave to this tuning, which fails to close by less than a cent, so that his suggestion is effectively 19 EDO.

In the 19th century, mathematician and music theorist Wesley Woolhouse proposed it as a more practical alternative to meantone temperaments he regarded as better, such as 50 EDO.

The composer Joel Mandelbaum wrote his Ph.D. thesis on the properties of the 19 EDO tuning, and advocated for its use. In his thesis, he argued that it is the only viable system with a number of divisions between 12 and 22, and furthermore that the next smallest number of divisions resulting in a significant improvement in approximating just intervals is the 31 tone equal temperament. Mandelbaum and Joseph Yasser have written music with 19 EDO. Easley Blackwood has stated that 19 EDO makes possible "a substantial enrichment of the tonal repertoire".

Notation

19-EDO can be represented with the traditional letter names and system of sharps and flats by treating flats and sharps as distinct notes; in 19-EDO only B is enharmonic with C, and E with F. This article will use that notation.

Interval size

Here are the sizes of some common intervals and comparison with the ratios arising in the harmonic series; the difference column measures in cents the distance from an exact fit to these ratios.

For reference, the difference from the perfect fifth in the widely used 12 TET is 1.955 cents flat, the difference from the major third is 13.686 cents sharp, the minor third is 15.643 cents flat, and the (lost) harmonic minor seventh is 31.174 cents sharp.

A possible variant of 19-ED2 is 93-ED30, i.e. the division of 30:1 in 93 equal steps, correspondig to a stretiching of the octave by 27.58¢, which improves the approximation of most natural ratios.

Scale diagram

Because 19 is a prime number, repeating any fixed interval in this tuning system cycles through all possible notes; just as one may cycle through 12-EDO on the circle of fifths, since a fifth is 7 semitones, and number 7 does not divide 12 evenly (7 is coprime to 12).

Modes

Ionian mode (major scale)

Dorian mode

Phrygian mode

Lydian mode

Mixolydian mode

Aeolian mode (natural minor scale)

Locrian mode

See also
Archicembalo, instrument with a double keyboard layout consisting of a 19 tone system close to 19tet in pitch with an additional 12 tone keyboard that is tuned approximately a quartertone in between the white keys of the 19 tone keyboard.
Beta scale
Elaine Walker (composer)
meantone temperament
musical temperament
31 Tone Equal Temperament

References

Further reading

External links

 Jeff Harrington is a composer who has written several pieces for piano in the 19 TET tuning, and there are both scores and MP3's available for download on this site.

Fabio Costa: "Meditation" in 19 ED2 (Oct 14, 2018)

Equal temperaments
Microtonality